Octafluoropropane (C3F8) is the perfluorocarbon counterpart to the hydrocarbon propane. This non-flammable synthetic material has applications in semiconductor production and medicine. It is also an extremely potent greenhouse gas.

Manufacture
Octafluoropropane can be produced either by electrochemical fluorination or by the Fowler process using cobalt fluoride.

Applications
In the electronics industry, octafluoropropane is mixed with oxygen and used as a plasma etching material for SiO2 layers in semiconductor applications, as oxides are selectively etched versus their metal substrates.

In medicine, octafluoropropane may compose the gas cores of microbubble contrast agents used in contrast-enhanced ultrasound. Octafluoropropane microbubbles reflect sound waves well and are used to improve the ultrasound signal backscatter.

It is used in eye surgery, such as pars plana vitrectomy procedures where a retina hole or tear is repaired. The gas provides a long-term tamponade, or plug, of a retinal hole or tear and allows re-attachment of the retina to occur over the several days following the procedure.

Under the name R-218, octafluoropropane is used in other industries as a component of refrigeration mixtures.

It has been featured in some plans for terraforming Mars. With a greenhouse gas effect 24,000 times greater than carbon dioxide (CO2), octafluoropropane could dramatically reduce the time and resources it takes to terraform Mars.

It is the active liquid in PICO-2L dark matter bubble detector (joined PICASSO and COUPP collaborations).

Major hazards
Greenhouse gas
Inert gas asphyxiation

References

External links
 Red Planet Turning Green?
 Compressed Liquid Densities for octafluoropropane R218

Perfluoroalkanes
Refrigerants